Beryl D. Roberts (born August 26, 1958) is an American politician in the state of Florida.

Early life and education 
Robers was born in Columbia, South Carolina. She earned a Bachelor of Science degree from Florida State University and a Juris Doctor from the Florida State University College of Law.

Career 
Outside of politics, Roberts has worked as an attorney. She was elected to the Florida House of Representatives in 1992 and served until 2000.

References 

Florida State University alumni
Democratic Party members of the Florida House of Representatives
1958 births
Living people